In Unix and Unix-like operating systems, type is a command that describes how its arguments would be interpreted if used as command names.

Function
Where applicable, type will display the command name's path. Possible command types are:
 shell built-in
 function
 alias
 hashed command
 keyword

The command returns a non-zero exit status if command names cannot be found.

Examples
$ type test
test is a shell builtin
$ type cp
cp is /bin/cp
$ type unknown
unknown not found
$ type type
type is a shell builtin

History
The type command was a shell builtin for Bourne shell that was introduced in AT&T's System V Release 2 (SVR2) in 1984, and continues to be included in many other POSIX-compatible shells such as Bash. However, type is not part of the POSIX standard. With a POSIX shell, similar behavior is retrieved with
 command -V name

In the KornShell, the command whence provides similar functionality.

The command is available as a separate package for Microsoft Windows as part of the UnxUtils collection of native Win32 ports of common GNU Unix-like utilities.

See also

 List of Unix commands
 which (command)
 hash (Unix)

References

Standard Unix programs
Unix SUS2008 utilities
IBM i Qshell commands